Pterostylis littoralis, commonly known as the coastal leafy greenhood, is a plant in the orchid family Orchidaceae and is endemic to South Australia. Flowering plants have up to five pale green flowers with darker green stripes and brownish tips. The flowers have a narrow, pale green labellum. Non-flowering plants have a rosette of leaves on a short, thin stalk but flowering plants lack the rosette, instead having four or five stem leaves.

Description
Pterostylis littoralis, is a terrestrial,  perennial, deciduous, herb with an underground tuber. Non-flowering plants have a rosette of between three and five leaves. The dorsal sepal and petals are fused, forming a hood or "galea" over the column with the dorsal sepal having a short point on its brownish tip. Flowering occurs from July to September.

Taxonomy and naming
The coastal leafy greenhood was first formally described in 2006 by David Jones who gave it the name Bunochilus littoralis and published the description in Australian Orchid Research from a specimen collected near Lake St Clair. In 2008 Robert Bates changed the name to Pterostylis littoralis. The specific epithet (littoralis) is derived from the Latin word littus meaning "shore", referring to the coastal habitat preference of this species.

Distribution and habitat
Pterostylis littoralis grows in dense coastal scrub in coastal areas near Robe.

References

littoralis
Endemic orchids of Australia
Orchids of Victoria (Australia)
Plants described in 2006